Hassan Abbas Moghnieh (born 7 February 1986) is a Lebanese footballer who plays as a goalkeeper for  club Bourj.

Club career 
Moghnieh joined the Ansar youth team on 28 October 2002; he has won a league title and three Lebanese FA Cups with the team. On 12 July 2021, Moghnieh joined Bourj.

International career 
Moghnieh was the first-choice goalkeeper in the Lebanese Olympic team that attempted to qualify for the 2008 Summer Olympics in Beijing, China.

Honours 
Ansar
 Lebanese Premier League: 2020–21
 Lebanese FA Cup: 2011–12, 2016–17, 2020–21
 Lebanese Super Cup: 2012

Bourj
 Lebanese Challenge Cup: 2021

References

External links
 
 
 

1986 births
Living people
People from Tyre District
Lebanese footballers
Association football goalkeepers
Al Ansar FC players
Bourj FC players
Lebanese Premier League players
Lebanon youth international footballers
Lebanon international footballers